Breakfast on the Morning Tram is an album by American jazz singer Stacey Kent that was nominated for the Grammy Award for Best Jazz Vocal Album in 2009. It was her first album for Blue Note Records.  The album features four songs with lyrics written by novelist Kazuo Ishiguro.

Track listing
 "The Ice Hotel" (Jim Tomlinson, Kazuo Ishiguro)
 "Landslide" (Stevie Nicks)
 "Ces Petits Riens" (Serge Gainsbourg)
 "I Wish I Could Go Travelling Again" (Tomlinson/Ishiguro)
 "So Many Stars" (Sérgio Mendes, Alan Bergman, Marilyn Bergman) 
 "Samba Saravah" (Baden Powell, Vinicius de Moraes, Pierre Barouh) 
 "Breakfast on the Morning Tram" (Tomlinson/Ishiguro)
 "Never Let Me Go" (Jay Livingston, Ray Evans)
 "So Romantic" (Tomlinson/Ishiguro)
 "Hard Hearted Hannah" (Milton Ager, Jack Yellen, Bob Bigelow, Charles Bates)
 "La Saison des Pluies" (Serge Gainsbourg, Elek Bacsik)
 "What a Wonderful World" (Bob Thiele, George David Weiss)

Musicians
 Stacey Kent – vocals
 Jim Tomlinson – tenor sax, alto sax, soprano sax, flute
 Graham Harvey – piano, Fender Rhodes
 John Parricelli – guitar
 Dave Chamberlain – bass
 Matt Skelton – drums, percussion

References

Stacey Kent albums
2007 albums
Blue Note Records albums
Works by Kazuo Ishiguro
Songs about trains